Barbara-Kimberly Cannon (born August 27, 1990) is an American actress known for Switched At Birth and Why Women Kill. She is from Kailua, Honolulu, Hawaii. A survivor of childhood neuroblastoma, Cannon became a volunteer and later director of the "Camp Ānuenue" non-profit retreat for children dealing with cancer based in the North Shore of Oahu.

Early life
Cannon was born in Kailua, Hawaii. At age 3 she was diagnosed with neuroblastoma. She became a camper at "Camp Ānuenue", which later inspired her to become a volunteer there. When funding was pulled from the facility, she became a director and created the 501(c)(3) organization.

Career
Cannon's first onscreen appearances were on the Flight 29 Down series, and it's The Hotel Tango movie sequel. In 2010, she appeared in a commercial for Call of Duty: Black Ops. She followed this up playing the recurring character Mary Beth Tucker on Switched at Birth from 2013 to 2017. In 2015, she starred as Melissa Stanton on Yahoo! Screen's Sin City Saints. In 2021, she played Dee, the daughter of main character Alma, on the second season of Why Women Kill.

Filmography

Film

Television

References

External links

People from Oahu
Activists from Hawaii
Actresses from Honolulu
Living people
1990 births
20th-century American actresses
21st-century American actresses